Diocese of Tiraspol may refer to:
 Diocese of Tiraspol and Dubăsari, a diocese of the Moldovan Orthodox Church
 Roman Catholic Diocese of Tiraspol (Russia), a former diocese of the Roman Catholic Church